33 Stonegate is a historic building in the city centre of York, in England.

The timber framed building was constructed in the early 17th century, probably at the same time as the similar building at 31 Stonegate.  Late in the century, it was extended to the rear, in brick.  The front was originally pargetted, but this was removed in the late 19th century and replaced by plain plaster with elaborately carved wood.  This incorporates the date "1489", but this does not relate to any event in the history of the site.

The building has three stories and an attic, each of which is jettied.  The ground floor has a shopfront, and at its right hand end is a bracket supporting a carving of the devil.  The devil is believed to have advertised a printing business in the building, a "printer's devil" being a nickname for a printer's assistant.  Inside, a late-17th century rises the height of the building.  Several original doors survive, as does the panelling in the front room on the first floor.

The building was grade II* listed in 1954.  Since 2017, it has housed the flagship shop of Abraham Moon, a woollen mill based in Guiseley.

A local story states that Laurence Sterne lived at the house for several years, and he would frighten off potential thieves by banging his walking stick against his bedroom wall, a sound which can supposedly still be heard in neighbouring 35 Stonegate.

References

Stonegate 33
Houses completed in the 17th century
Stonegate (York)
Timber framed buildings in Yorkshire